The Ballaine House is a historic homestead in Seward, Alaska, United States. The home was built in 1905 by prominent Seward businessman Frank Ballaine. Frank was the brother of John Ballaine, who is considered the founding father of Seward. The building currently houses a bed and breakfast.

History
Beginning in 1902, a group of Seattle businessman sought to establish a railroad to connect southern Alaska with Fairbanks in the Interior. After crews surveyed many different routes, John Ballaine selected the northern coast of Resurrection Bay as the southern terminus of their route, as the Bay remains free of ice year-round. John Ballaine obtained much of the land for the town site. His brother Frank lived in Seward and was responsible for selling lots in the town and overseeing the railroad construction, as John remained in Seattle. Frank also founded the town's first newspaper, the Seward Gateway, in 1904. When a telegraph connection to Seward was completed, Ballaine provided news from the lower 48 states in his paper.

In 1905, Frank Ballaine married in Seattle and returned to Seward and began construction of his residence. In that same year, six other homes of similar quality were constructed on that block, and the street was nicknamed "Millionaire's Row", as the owners believed Alaska would soon have one million residents and Seward would be its "Gateway".

Description
The first floor contains many windows, a sign of wealth, and usual for that time and location.

It was added to the National Register of Historic Places on July 12, 1978.

See also
National Register of Historic Places listings in Kenai Peninsula Borough, Alaska

References

External links
Ballaine House B&B website

Houses in Kenai Peninsula Borough, Alaska
Houses completed in 1905
Houses on the National Register of Historic Places in Alaska
Bed and breakfasts in the United States
Buildings and structures in Seward, Alaska
Buildings and structures on the National Register of Historic Places in Kenai Peninsula Borough, Alaska
1905 establishments in Alaska